Rayalaseema Parirakshana Samithi (RPS) is a regional political party in the south Indian state of Andhra Pradesh with the main aim of creating a new state, Rayalaseema. The party was founded by former Telugu Desam Party leader Byreddy Rajasekhara Reddy in 2013 to champion the cause for a separate Rayalaseema state after the resolution passed on 30 July 2013 to carve out the state of Telangana from the pre-existing state of Andhra Pradesh.

References

2013 establishments in Andhra Pradesh
Political parties in Andhra Pradesh
Political parties established in 2013